Dimitrios Katiakos (alternate spelling: Dimitris) (born March 10, 1987 in Cholargos, Attica, Greece) is a Greek former professional basketball player. At a height of 2.05 m (6' 8" tall, he played at the power forward and center positions.

Professional career
At the club level, some of the teams that Katiakos played with included: Esperos Kallitheas, Panionios, Ikaros Kallitheas-Esperos, Arkadikos, Promitheas Patras, and Peristeri.

National team career
Katiakos also played with Greece's junior national teams at the FIBA Europe Under-18 Championship, and at the FIBA Europe Under-20 Championship.

External links
FIBA Europe Profile
EuroCup Profile
Eurobasket.com Profile

1987 births
Living people
Arkadikos B.C. players
Centers (basketball)
Diagoras Dryopideon B.C. players
Esperos B.C. players
Greek men's basketball players
Ikaros B.C. players
OFI Crete B.C. players
Panionios B.C. players
Peristeri B.C. players
Power forwards (basketball)
Promitheas Patras B.C. players
Basketball players from Athens